"Vice" is a song recorded by American country music artist Miranda Lambert. It was released to radio on July 18, 2016, as the lead single from Lambert's sixth studio album The Weight of These Wings (2016). The song was written by Lambert, Josh Osborne and Shane McAnally. "Vice" debuted at number two on the Hot Country Songs chart in August 2016. "Vice" was ranked at number 31 on Rolling Stones "50 Best Songs of 2016" list.

Commercial performance
In the United States, "Vice" had an opening week sales of 64,000 copies and 14.6 million audience impression, prompting it to debut at number 2 on the Hot Country Songs chart, becoming her highest debuting single on that chart, beating the number five debut of "Somethin' Bad." It also debuted at number 18 on the Country Airplay chart, beating the number 26 debut of "Automatic" as her highest debut on that chart. Concurrently, it debuted at number 47 on the Billboard Hot 100. It ultimately went on to peak at number 11 on the Country Airplay chart.

In Canada, the song debuted at number 35 on Canada Country chart and reached a peak of number 4 and debuted at number 99 on the Canadian Hot 100 and peaked at number 78.

As of March 2017, the song has sold 508,000 copies in the United States.

Music video
The music video was directed by Trey Fanjoy and premiered in September 2016. The video begins surveying a wrecked car which Lambert eventually stumbles out of. She is then shown walking down a country road away from the accident and eventually comes to a small town where she stops in a bar for a drink. She then continues to walk until she comes to a crossroads, where a car similar to the one from the beginning of the video pulls up without a driver behind the wheel. She gets into the backseat of the car and the video ends with it driving away.

Accolades

Charts

Weekly charts

Year end charts

Certifications

References

2016 songs
2016 singles
Miranda Lambert songs
RCA Records Nashville singles
Songs written by Miranda Lambert
Songs written by Josh Osborne
Songs written by Shane McAnally
Song recordings produced by Frank Liddell
Music videos directed by Trey Fanjoy